Figure skating competition at the 2017 European Youth Olympic Winter Festival was held in Erzurum, Turkey from February 13 to 15, 2017. Medals were awarded in men's and ladies' singles. Eligible skaters must have been born between July 1, 2000 and June 30, 2002.

Medal summary

Medalists

Medal table

Entries
Entries were published on 10 February 2017.

Results

Men

Ladies

References

External links
 Official website
 Results Book – Figure Skating

European Youth Olympics
2017 European Youth Olympic Winter Festival events
2017
2017 European Youth Olympics